The Fourth Musketeer is a 1923 American silent drama film directed by William K. Howard and starring Johnnie Walker, Eileen Percy and Eddie Gribbon.

Synopsis
A boxer quits the ring to set up as a garage mechanic. Life is complicated by his wife's flirtation with a high society man and some stolen jewels.

Cast
 Johnnie Walker as Brien O'Brien
 Eileen Percy as	Mrs. Brian O'Brien
 Eddie Gribbon as 	Mike Donovan
 William Scott as Joe Tracy
 Edith Yorke as Mrs. Tracy
 Georgie Stone as Jimmy Tracy
 James McElhern as Don O'Reilly
 Philo McCullough as Gerald Van Sicklen
 Kate Lester as Mrs. Rector

References

Bibliography
 Connelly, Robert B. The Silents: Silent Feature Films, 1910-36, Volume 40, Issue 2. December Press, 1998.
 Munden, Kenneth White. The American Film Institute Catalog of Motion Pictures Produced in the United States, Part 1. University of California Press, 1997.

External links
 

1923 films
1923 drama films
1920s English-language films
American silent feature films
Silent American drama films
American black-and-white films
Films directed by William K. Howard
Film Booking Offices of America films
1920s American films